If You Don't Love Me is a 1977 album by Freddy Fender.

Track listing 
"We'll Take Our Last Walk Tonight" 	 
"Louisiana Woman"
"How Are Things with You"
"If You're Looking for a Fool"
"If That's the Way You Want It"
"If You Don't Love Me"
"Think About Me"
"I Don't Want to Be Lonely" 
"Faking the Feeling"
"Love Rules the Heart"
"Your Loving Couldn't Take the Walking Out of My Shoes"
"I Don't Dream About You Anymore"

References 

Freddy Fender albums
1977 albums
Dot Records albums